Stephen John Parkin (born 7 November 1965) is an English football manager and former player who played as a defender. As of 2021, he serves as the assistant manager at Wrexham. He played for Mansfield Town, Stoke City and West Bromwich Albion and has been manager of Barnsley, Mansfield Town and Rochdale (two spells).

Playing career
Parkin was born in Mansfield and began his career with Stoke City, captaining the youth team to the final of the FA Youth Cup in 1984 where they lost out to Everton. He made his senior debut against Nottingham Forest in 1982–83 and was part of the defence which kept a clean sheet in a 1–0 victory. He played 16 games in 1984–85 in which was an awful season for Stoke as they suffered an embarrassing relegation, going down with a then record low points tally of 17. Parkin played 18 games in 1985–86 under new manager Mick Mills and fully established himself in the side in 1986–87 making 46 appearances as Stoke missed out on the play-offs by six points.

He played in 50 matches in 1987–88 before a groin injury restricted him to only four appearances in 1988–89. Parkin then moved on to West Bromwich Albion where he spent three seasons making 54 appearances scoring twice. He joined his home-town club Mansfield Town in July 1992 and was a player at Field Mill for four seasons making 96 appearances scoring four goals before retiring to become manager of the club.

Managerial career

Mansfield Town
Parkin started his managerial career at Mansfield Town at the start of the 1996–97 season after Andy King was sacked. Parkin, only 30 at the time, and club captain, took over as a caretaker manager, but went to last three seasons with the Stags, missing out closely on the play-offs in two of his three seasons. Parkin left Mansfield after his position became untenable due to a transfer embargo on the Nottinghamshire club, and joined Rochdale in the summer before the 1999–2000 season.

Rochdale
Parkin's first spell at Rochdale was a great success, and he lifted the Lancashire club from the depths of the league to an 8th-place finish in his first season. The team's success paved the way for big money signings like Paul Connor and Clive Platt.

Barnsley
On 9 November 2001 Parkin left Spotland and joined Barnsley. Parkin's spell at Barnsley was not a productive or a successful one. Barnsley were in the relegation place at the time of his take over in Division One and with a small transfer budget, Parkin could not improve their position and Barnsley were relegated in April 2002. With debt-ridden Barnsley struggling to stave off a second successive relegation, on 15 October 2002, the club went into administration and Parkin along with his assistant Tony Ford both lost their jobs.

Parkin did not find a managerial position for 14 months after his departure from Barnsley, although he expressed an interest in taking over at Colchester United. He became assistant manager at Notts County shortly after his sacking.

Return to Rochdale
In December 2003, Parkin went back to his former job at Rochdale, where Ford had already been re-employed as assistant-manager to Parkin's predecessor Alan Buckley. His first duty was to save Rochdale from relegation that season, which he did with a few games to spare, adding talent such as Grant Holt to the ranks, although Rochdale's final position was lower than when he took over. His second season saw Dale nearly reach the play-offs, but stumble late in the season. In the 2005–06 season, Parkin guided the club to what many saw as a backward step, only narrowly avoiding relegation.

Both Parkin and Dale were under an increasingly significant amount of pressure following a poor start to the 2006–07 season, which saw Rochdale gain only six points from eight matches. During the course of the season Dale lost arguably one of their best players of recent years, Rickie Lambert, an attacking midfielder/striker who was sold to Bristol Rovers for £200,000 on transfer deadline day in August 2006. Parkin's position became untenable and he was sacked shortly before Christmas.

Coaching career
In January 2007 he was installed as the first-team coach for Championship side Hull City, working alongside Phil Brown and Brian Horton. On 15 March 2010 he took over as joint caretaker manager with Brian Horton after Phil Brown was put on gardening leave. In June 2010 Nigel Pearson was appointed at the full-time successor to Phil Brown, and opted to bring his own backroom staff with him from his previous position at Leicester City, bringing to an end Parkin's association with the club.

On 6 October 2010, it was announced that Parkin would be swapping the north for the south bank of the Humber, joining newly appointed manager Ian Baraclough at Scunthorpe United. Parkin joined Bradford City as assistant manager to Phil Parkinson on 22 September 2011.

On 10 June 2016, he linked up with Parkinson once again as the Assistant Manager of Bolton Wanderers, signing a two-year contract at the Macron Stadium. On 2 November 2019 Parkin once again followed Parkinson, and became Sunderland's Assistant Manager.
But on 28 November 2020, Sunderland “parted ways” with their then manager Phil Parkinson, as Parkin also departed.  On 1 July 2021, Parkin again followed Parkinson to National League side Wrexham.

Career statistics

As a player
Source:

A.  The "Other" column constitutes appearances and goals in the Football League Trophy, Football League play-offs and Full Members Cup.

As a manager

Honours
 Stoke City
 Stoke City player of the year: 1988

References

External links
 
 

1965 births
Living people
Footballers from Mansfield
English footballers
England under-21 international footballers
Stoke City F.C. players
West Bromwich Albion F.C. players
Mansfield Town F.C. players
English football managers
Mansfield Town F.C. managers
Rochdale A.F.C. managers
Barnsley F.C. managers
Hull City A.F.C. non-playing staff
Scunthorpe United F.C. non-playing staff
Bradford City A.F.C. non-playing staff
Bolton Wanderers F.C. non-playing staff
Sunderland A.F.C. non-playing staff
Wrexham A.F.C. non-playing staff
English Football League players
Association football defenders